Kearsley railway station serves the town of Kearsley and the outlying villages of Stoneclough, Prestolee and Ringley in Greater Manchester, England. It was originally named Stoneclough.

The station was staffed until the early 1990s, however the arson attacking of the station building just below platform level saw an end to this arrangement.  In the spring of 2015, the station's pedestrian rail crossing was replaced by a footbridge and the platforms rebuilt as part of modernisation work to electrify the line and raise line speeds to 100 mph.

Facilities

The station is unmanned, however, there is a ticket machine on the Bolton-bound platform that allows passengers to pay for a ticket by card. Passengers wishing to pay by cash can use these machines to obtain a ‘Promise to Pay’ ticket.  There are simple waiting shelters on each platform, with train running information provided by telephone and timetable posters. Step free access is available to both platforms via Station Road. However, passengers coming from Stoneclough  village would have to walk further to access these facilities.

Services
Evening trains began stopping here at the May 2018 timetable change, but ongoing electrification work on the Manchester to Preston route saw all weekend trains replaced by buses for most of 2017–18; electric service eventually starting on Monday 11 February 2019 initially utilising Class 319 electric multiple units (though the Wigan to Manchester trains serving the station are still diesel operated).

There is no Sunday service.

21st century upgrade and electrification

In 2009, Andrew Adonis in a government paper, proposed infill electrification schemes in the North West of England. After a spending review, in July 2012 the Coalition government announced 25 kV AC railway electrification reconfirming the scheme previously announced by Adonis. Amongst schemes announced for electrification were Manchester - Euxton Junction through Kearsley railway station and thence to Euxton Junction. The project also called for a major civil engineering project to rebore the Farnworth tunnel on the line in advance of electrification.

References

Bibliography

External links 

Railway stations in the Metropolitan Borough of Bolton
DfT Category F2 stations
Former Lancashire and Yorkshire Railway stations
Railway stations in Great Britain opened in 1838
Northern franchise railway stations